The 1993 Atlanta mayoral election occurred on November 2, 1993, with a runoff election held on November 23, 1993.

Incumbent mayor Maynard Jackson declined to seek reelection to what would have been a fourth overall (and second consecutive) term, citing family and personal reasons.

Since no candidate received a majority in the general election, a runoff election was held between the top-two finishers. Bill Campbell won election in the runoff.

Candidates
Advanced to runoff
Bill Campbell, Atlanta city councilor
Michael Lomax, former chairman of the Fulton County Board of Commissioners and 1989 mayoral candidate

Eliminated in general election
A. Amenra
Bob Braxton
James A. Coleman
Myrtle Davis, Atlanta city councilor
John Genins
David Librace
Lafayette Perry
Nancy Smith Schaefer, activist
Mark Teal
Mitchell Williams

Campaign

General election
The election would determine who would, expectedly, serve as mayor during the upcoming 1996 Summer Olympics in the city. Among the issues that the individual elected mayor would inherit would be an Olympics that were considered significantly behind-schedule in regards to planning.

Peter Applebome of The New York Times, on October 15, 1993 characterized the races being largely between Campbell, Davis, and Lomax, in which Campbell was leading, and Lomax was likely to place second. Applebome wrote, "the three have mounted a civilized, relatively low-key race in which polls show Mr. Campbell with a healthy lead" Applebome also wrote that the candidates had waged an "issue-oriented race".

Crime was a major topic of the campaign. Campbell proposed reorganizing the city's police department, placing more officers in the city's neighborhoods, and rehiring retired officers to give more staffing flexibility (while costing less to train then new officers). Lomax proposed hiring 400 new police officers. Davis focused more on addressing the social causes behind crime.

Outgoing mayor Maynard Jackson endorsed Campbell.

Lomax had high name-recognition, but also had high disapproval in opinion polling.

Runoff
Observers considered the runoff campaign between Campbell and Lomax as having been ugly. Instead of being issues-focused, the campaign became focused on questions that Lomax made regarding Campbell's ties to a federal corruption probe and questionable expenditures at Hartsfield International Airport.

Results

General election (November 2)

Runoff (November 23)

References

1993 in Atlanta
1993 Georgia (U.S. state) elections
1993 United States mayoral elections
1993